We Who Go the Kitchen Route ) is a 1953 Danish comedy film directed by Erik Balling and starring Birgitte Reimer, Ib Schønberg and Ellen Margrethe Stein.

Cast
 Birgitte Reimer as Helga  
 Ib Schønberg as Helgas far  
 Ellen Margrethe Stein as Tanten  
 Henrik Wiehe as Jørgen  
 Henning Moritzen as Dick  
 Jytte Grathwohl as Grethe  
 Jytte Ibsen as Nina  
 Anne Arntz as Lisbeth  
 Bent Christensen as Erik  
 Gunnar Lauring as Salgschefen  
 Karin Nellemose as Fruen  
 Johannes Meyer as Redaktør Sort  
 Anna Henriques-Nielsen as Fruen  
 Svend Methling as Godsejer Bech  
 Agnes Rehni as Fru Bech 
 Lise Ringheim as Lotte  
 Vera Gebuhr as Fru Bewer  
 Jens Meincke as Lille Povl  
 Inger Lassen as Laura  
 Kirsten Rolffes as Olga  
 Keld Markuslund as Andreas  
 Bjørn Watt-Boolsen as Hans Frigaard  
 Ove Sprogøe as Skrædder Opdal  
 Gabriel Axel as Professor  
 Otto Detlefsen as Inkassator  
 Preben Thyring as Salgschefens barn  
 Jørgen Thyring as Salgschefens barn  
 Janette Døllé as Salgschefens barn

References

Bibliography 
 Mette Hjort & Ib Bondebjerg. The Danish Directors: Dialogues on a Contemporary National Cinema. Intellect Books, 2003.

External links 
 

1953 films
1953 comedy films
Danish comedy films
1950s Danish-language films
Films directed by Erik Balling
Danish black-and-white films